Bi-Lo was an Australian supermarket chain owned by Wesfarmers. Once a chain of 180 outlets, Bi-Lo stores were progressively re-branded as Coles Supermarkets from 2006, or closed. On 30 June 2017, the final store in Shailer Park, Queensland closed.

History 
Bi-Lo was established by John, Peter and David Weeks in South Australia in 1979.  The first stores opened at Stirling and Aldgate in South Australia's Adelaide Hills region after being converted from hardware outlets, followed by the acquisition of a third store at Murray Bridge. Coles Myer cited that by 1979, Bi-Lo was South Australia's cheapest grocer.

Bi-Lo was a leader in adopting new technology and by 1983 operated product scanning systems in all stores, the first grocery chain store in Australia to complete scanning across all stores in the group.

By 1987, Bi-Lo was operating 28 supermarkets in South Australia and generating one third of metropolitan Adelaide’s supermarket sales, when it was acquired by Coles Myer, which also purchased the 34-store Shoeys discount supermarket chain in New South Wales (subsequently renamed as Bi-Lo). Bi-Lo later expanded into Queensland and Victoria.

In December 1994, Bi-Lo opened its first Mega Frrresh store at Greenacres, South Australia, in response to its then chief competitor Franklins "Big Fresh" concept.  In 1996, Bi-Lo acquired six Newmart supermarkets in Western Australia although the Newmart name was retained due to its strong brand identification.  In 1998, Bi-Lo purchased three Northern Territory supermarkets in Darwin and Alice Springs.

Bi-Lo/Newmart opened nine new stores and completed 23 refurbishments in 2000, and opened 26 more stores and completed 11 refurbishments in 2001. The last Newmart stores in Western Australia to open before the chain was absorbed into Coles Supermarkets were at Garden City, Booragoon (October 2000) and Ocean Keys, Clarkson (July 2001). Newmart Stores in Garden City, Collie, Stirling Central, Noranda and Ocean Keys became an Action Supermarkets outlet at the same time, then became a Woolworths outlet.

In 2002, Bi-Lo acquired and converted 15 Franklins sites, in New South Wales (Warilla Grove, Campbelltown - now Coles, Hillsdale - closed 2003, Mount Druitt - closed 2005, Shellharbour, Lavington, Thirroul), Queensland (Kawana, Capalaba - Closed 2007 reopened as Coles 2008, Hope Island, Loganholme), Victoria (Southland, Waverley Gardens - closed 2004, Lalor, Broadmeadows) and South Australia (Unley - closed 2005). Around 820 former Franklins employees were offered positions at Bi-Lo. Bi-Lo also opened 7 stores and a Bi-Lo Discount Petrol site at Narrandera, New South Wales. In August of that year, all Newmart Supermarkets operated by Bi-Lo in Western Australia were transferred to the management of Coles Supermarkets. One Newmart Supermarket located in Bentley, Western Australia was rebadged as Coles, subsequently closing in September 2017.

In 2003, Bi-Lo relaunched with the slogan "Why Pay More".

In July 2006, Coles Myer CEO John Fletcher announced a strategy to progressively re-brand Bi-Lo, Kmart, First Choice Liquor, Liquorland and Theo's under the Coles banner. Bi-Lo supermarkets were to be re-branded as Coles supermarkets, with others changing to other Coles Group businesses. Coles planned to keep some Bi-Lo lines in its re-branded stores. Re-branding Bi-Lo stores began later in 2006 and had been expected to be completed by mid-2007. A small number of stores were to be re-branded Coles Discount Grocery where a Coles Supermarket already existed in the same complex (for example, at Westfield Fountain Gate). However, Northcote Shopping Centre have two Coles Supermarkets in their proximity which were former Bi-Lo sites, and they still operate to this day.

Some stores, such as Bi-Lo Arkaba in South Australia, were originally Coles Supermarkets before being re-branded to Bi-Lo in the late 1990s. Some Bi-Lo stores were re-branded to Coles Supermarkets, despite Coles already existing in the same shopping centre (like Northcote Plaza and Ingle Farm Shopping Centre, where there are two Coles stores).

However, Coles Group announced in March 2007 it was "pausing" the re-branding of Bi-Lo stores to Coles, following the poor results of the 129 stores re-branded thus far.  Market analysts commented that the conversion program was unsuccessful due to Coles' transforming of stores in affluent areas first, the replacement of Bi-Lo's budget items with more expensive equivalents, and the removal of trademark budget meat packs.

Reflecting on the failed conversion strategy later in 2007, Coles chief operating officer Mick McMahon stated "a strategy you can't execute is probably not the right strategy".

In October 2008, Coles stated it was planning to create a discount supermarket chain to replace the remaining Bi-Lo stores. In 2009, Coles stated it would sell eight of the remaining Bi-Lo stores to rival chain Foodworks.
Further stores were closed or marked for closure due to poor performance and small store size, including Armidale and Merimbula.

At its peak, Bi-Lo had more than 180 stores and employed 13,600 people. By March 2009, only 48 stores remained, largely in NSW and Queensland. At the end of December 2014, that number had decreased to six stores.  As at March 2016 with the closure of Toombul and Alderley (both later reopened as Coles) in Brisbane and as of April 2016 Coles take over of the Lisarow store in New South Wales left only one store remaining at Loganholme, Queensland. This store closed on 30 June 2017, ending the Bi-Lo brand after 38 years in operation.

Advertising
The tag-line "Extra Value for You" was used between 1999 and 2003, which was replaced by "Why Pay More!" Between 2000 and 2005, TV cook Iain Hewitson was the face of Bi-Lo and Newmart supermarkets across Australia, with Bi-Lo sponsoring and supplying his cooking shows. In late 2005, a stylised Bi-Lo docket was adopted as Bi-Lo's mascot and its use replaced Hewitson. At this time, the tag-line "It's the total of the docket that counts!" was used. In 2003, a campaign recording customer answers to "Why do you shop at Bi-Lo?" was used. In 2007 amid the Coles conversion, an election-style campaign also featured the stylised Bi-Lo Docket with the tag "Reduce the total of your docket!" Former slogans included "We Do, You Do" and "Cheap Groceries".

Formats

Bi-Lo Mega Frrresh
In response to its main competitor Franklins launching "Franklins Big Fresh" in the early 1990s, Bi-Lo launched its Mega Frrresh brand at Greenacres, South Australia in 1994. Like Franklins Big Fresh, it combined discount shopping with a market-style atmosphere.

Newmart
Bi-Lo purchased six Newmart supermarkets in 1996 for A$16 million. Newmart was a small independent discount chain in Perth, Western Australia with a similar format to Bi-Lo: discount groceries, bulk foods, extensive fresh produce, meat and delicatessen sections.  Bi-Lo was unable to re-brand the stores since Foodland Associated Limited traded stores in Western Australia under the Bi-Lo name at the time.  The Newmart chain grew to 18 stores by 2002, had its own website until 2006, and like Bi-Lo, launched the slogan "Extra Value for You" in 1999. Started in 1987 by Fred Fairthorne of Farmer Jack's fame, as an independent discount supermarket with three stores in Greenwood, Floreat and Kardinya by 1992 to the West Australian Independent Grocers buying group - which also included Farmer Jack's, Advantage. MAC's and Charlie Carter's - its home brand products were "Black & Gold". A further three stores were opened between 1992 and the sale to Coles and its reincarnation into a Western Australian version of Coles' South Australian-based budget brand Bi-Lo in 1996, with the introduction of Bi-Lo branded products and the well-recognised Newmart tick logo rejigged to match Bi-Lo's yellow logo, among other things being refitted at Newmart to match Bi-Lo's national image, retaining its name in the process.

In 2002, Coles assumed management of Newmart, immediately re-branding seven stores as Coles supermarkets, before discontinuing the Newmart brand in 2003, selling five stores to Action Supermarkets); all five Action supermarkets were later bought out and became Woolworths outlets. These stores were located at Noranda, Stirling Central, Booragoon, Clarkson and Collie. Coles Supermarket in Bentley, Western Australia still contained Newmart awnings, aisle signage and checkouts up until the store closed on 22 September 2017. The site was then immediately refurbished to become a Spud Shed. The Woolworths store at Stirling Central Shopping Centre in Westminster, Western Australia still contained Newmart awnings, checkouts and security (loss prevention) buzzers on stands at the end of the checkouts until its refurbishment in 2018.

References

External links
 Bi-Lo (archived)

Defunct supermarkets of Australia
Retail companies established in 1979
1979 establishments in Australia
Retail companies disestablished in 2017
2017 disestablishments in Australia
Coles Group
Australian grocers